Gehri is a surname. Notable people with the surname include:

Hermann Gehri (1899–1979), Swiss freestyle wrestler and Olympic champion
Maurice Gehri, Swiss Delegate of the International Committee of the Red Cross during the Gemlik-Yalova Peninsula massacres

See also 
Gehri Buttar, is a normal sized village in the Bathinda district of Eastern Punjab (India)
Gehri Chaal, Bollywood Action thriller film
Gehri Chot - Urf: Durdesh, is an Indo-Canadian and Bangladeshi co-production film